Ixia polystachya, the white-and-yellow-flower cornlily, is an Ixia species found on hills and slopes of northwest and southwest Cape, South Africa.

References

External links
 
 

Garden plants of Africa
Flora of the Cape Provinces
polystachya